Dryophylax duida  is a species of snake in the family Colubridae. The species is endemic to Venezuela

References

Dryophylax
Snakes of South America
Reptiles of Venezuela
Endemic fauna of Venezuela
Reptiles described in 1996